Andrews Peak is a summit in Tuolumne County, California, in the United States.

Andrews Peak was named for Professor George Leonard Andrews of West Point.

References

Mountains of Tuolumne County, California
Mountains of Northern California